Canadian singer and songwriter Shawn Mendes has recorded songs for three studio albums, two extended plays (EP), two live albums and guest features. Mendes signed with Island Records in May 2014. His debut EP, The Shawn Mendes EP, released in July 2014, was preceded by the single "Life of the Party". Mendes' debut studio album Handwritten, released in April 2015, and reissued as Handwritten (Revisited) with live recordings and four new songs in November that year, included the singles "Life of the Party", "Something Big", "Stitches" and "I Know What You Did Last Summer". He collaborated with other artists, including Astrid S and Camila Cabello, to create the pop rock album. Mendes appeared as a featured artist on the Vamps' song "Oh Cecilia (Breaking My Heart)" (2014), and contributed a song called "Believe" to the Descendants soundtrack (2015). He has released two live albums titled, Live at Madison Square Garden (2016), and MTV Unplugged (2017). Both contain live performances of previously released material, along with cover versions of "Hey There Delilah" by Plain White T's and the Jackson 5's "I Want You Back" on the former, and Kings of Leon's "Use Somebody" on the latter.

Mendes' second studio album Illuminate, released in September 2016, included the singles "Treat You Better", "Mercy" and "There's Nothing Holdin' Me Back". Musically, it blends rock, pop and blues, showcasing a more "matured" and "meticulous" side of the singer according to Associated Press' Mesfin Fekadu. His self-titled third studio album was released in May 2018, and included the singles "In My Blood", "Lost in Japan", "Youth", "Where Were You in the Morning?" and "Nervous". During the creation of this album, Mendes was influenced by several genres including rock and R&B. It featured collaborations with Julia Michaels and Khalid. The singles "If I Can't Have You", and the duet with Camila Cabello, "Señorita", were released in May and June 2019 respectively, and both featured on the deluxe edition of his eponymous album. Mendes' fourth studio album, the pop Wonder, which features "big choruses, lush arrangements and momentous fanfares," according to Varietys Jem Aswad, was released in December 2020. It was supported by the singles "Wonder" and "Monster". He released the standalone singles "Summer of Love" and "It'll Be Okay" in 2021, and "When You're Gone" the following year.

Songs

Notes

References

External links

Shawn Mendes on AllMusic

Mendes, Shawn